Betpuli is a census town in the Habra I CD block in the  Barasat Sadar subdivision of the North 24 Parganas district in the state of West Bengal, India.

Geography

Location

Area overview
The area covered in the map alongside is largely a part of the north Bidyadhari Plain. located in the lower Ganges Delta. The country is flat. It is a little raised above flood level and the highest ground borders the river channels.54.67% of the people of the densely populated area lives in the urban areas and 45.33% lives in the rural  areas.

Note: The map alongside presents some of the notable locations in the subdivision. All places marked in the map are linked in the larger full screen map.

Demographics
According to the 2011 Census of India, Betpuli had a total population of 9,404, of which 4,777 (51%) were males and 4,627 (49%) were females. Population in the age range 0-6 years was 833. The total number of literate persons in  Betpuli was 7,561 (88.31% of the population over 6 years).

Infrastructure
According to the District Census Handbook, North Twenty Four Parganas,  2011, Betpuli covered an area of 2.0106 km2. The protected water-supply involved hand pump, tank, pond, lake. It had 964 domestic electric connections. Among the educational facilities, it had 2 primary schools, other schools at Rajballavpur 3  km away. The nearest college was 13 km away at Habra. It specialises in tailoring.

References

Cities and towns in North 24 Parganas district